Serena Williams was the defending champion and successfully defended her title, defeating Simona Halep in the final, 6–3, 7–6(7–5).

Seeds
The top eight seeds received a bye into the second round. 

 Serena Williams (champion)
 Maria Sharapova (withdrew because of a right leg injury)
 Simona Halep (final)
 Petra Kvitová (second round)
 Caroline Wozniacki (second round)
 Ana Ivanovic (quarterfinals)
 Lucie Šafářová (quarterfinals)
 Karolína Plíšková (third round)
  Garbiñe Muguruza (first round)
 Carla Suárez Navarro (first round)
 Angelique Kerber (first round)
 Timea Bacsinszky (first round)
 Agnieszka Radwańska (first round)
 Elina Svitolina (semifinals)
 Andrea Petkovic (third round)
 Sara Errani (first round)

Draw

Finals

Top half

Section 1

Section 2

Bottom half

Section 3

Section 4

Qualifying

Seeds

Qualifiers

Lucky loser
  Mirjana Lučić-Baroni

Draw

First qualifier

Second qualifier

Third qualifier

Fourth qualifier

Fifth qualifier

Sixth qualifier

Seventh qualifier

Eighth qualifier

Ninth qualifier

Tenth qualifier

Eleventh qualifier

Twelfth qualifier

References
Main Draw
Qualifying Draw

Women's Singles